Bobrek may refer to:

Bobrek, Bytom
Bobrek, Cieszyn
Bobrek, Lesser Poland Voivodeship
Bobrek concentration camp, located there
Bobrek, Masovian Voivodeship
Bobrek, Subcarpathian Voivodeship